Bergen Travpark is a harness racing track at Åsane in Bergen, Norway. Owned by Norwegian Trotting Association, its tote betting is handled by Norsk Rikstoto. The venue opened on 15 June 1985.

References

External links
 Official website

Sports venues in Bergen
Harness racing venues in Norway
Sports venues completed in 1985
1985 establishments in Norway